Bearys Institute of Technology (BIT) is a private technical co-educational college located in Lands End, Inoli, Karnataka, India, near Mangalore. Founded by The Bearys Group under the aegis of Bearys Academy of Learning and was established in 2009. It is affiliated to the Visvesvaraya Technological University, Belgaum.

History
BIT was founded in 2009 by Syed Mohammed Beary, an educationist and philanthropist having worked on infrastructure. BIT is part of Bearys Academy of Learning which owns and manages several educational institutions across various streams.

Location
The campus is on a  plateau overlooking the Netravathi River valley. The college offers independent residential facilities for boys, girls and faculty. The BIT campus adheres to the norms and guidelines of Green Building Sustainable Development.

Departments and courses
BIT offers Bachelor of Engineering (B.E.) 4 year degree programs in following disciplines:

 Civil Engineering 
 Computer Science and Engineering
 Electronics and Communication Engineering
 Mechanical Engineering

BIT also offers postgraduate programs leading to the award of Master of Technology (M.Tech) degree in the following engineering branches.
 Mechanical Engineering (Machine Drawing)
 Computer Science and Engineering

Placements and training
The Training and Placement Cell at Bearys Institute of Technology is directed by the Head of Outreach Programs. It has a full time qualified training and placement officer who handles these programs. The cell has now streamlined its operations and is also active in inviting industry partners to conduct campus interviews. The T&P cell helps students who register for its services to attend campus interviews at other places as well. It also facilitates students to attend field selection tests and exams for service into the defense forces of India as well as the Merchant Navy.

References

External links
 BIT (Official website)
 BIT students built hybrid car powered by water
 BIT protest against illegal quarrying
 https://www.daijiworld.com/news/newsDisplay.aspx?newsID=450077
 BIT students built a bike engine car
 http://www.daijiworld.com/news/newsDisplay.aspx?newsID=150479

Engineering colleges in Mangalore
Educational institutions established in 2009
Affiliates of Visvesvaraya Technological University
2009 establishments in Karnataka